This article concerns the period 479 BC – 470 BC.

References